The Moreau River is a tributary of the Missouri River, approximately  long, in South Dakota in the United States. Moreau River has the name of a pioneer trader.

It rises in two forks in northwestern South Dakota, in the Badlands of Butte and Harding Counties. The two forks flow ESE and unite near Zeona in southern Perkins County. The combined stream flows east, past Usta, and across the Cheyenne River Indian Reservation, past Iron Lightning, Thunder Butte, Green Grass and Whitehorse. It joins the Missouri in Lake Oahe, with the lower  of the river forming an arm of the reservoir.

The river generally parallels its neighbor  to the north, the Grand River, running from west to east to join the Missouri. The Moreau River also has Sand Creek as a source, along with the North and South Forks, and claims several tributaries, such as the Little Moreau, Deep, Red Earth, Antelope, and Thunder Butte Rivers.

Variant names
According to the Geographic Names Information System, it has also been known historically as:
Big Owl Creek
Cerwercerna River
Hinyankaga
Main Owl River
Mistai'yohe
Murow Creek
Owl River
Sur war har na ha River

See also
List of rivers of South Dakota

References

External links

Rivers of South Dakota
Tributaries of the Missouri River
Rivers of Harding County, South Dakota
Rivers of Custer County, South Dakota
Rivers of Perkins County, South Dakota
Rivers of Ziebach County, South Dakota
Rivers of Dewey County, South Dakota